Minnertsga is a village in Waadhoeke municipality in the province of Friesland, the Netherlands. It had a population of around 1,750 in January 2017. Before 2018, the village was part of het Bildt municipality.

History 
The village was first mentioned in the 13th century as Menerdkerke. It means "settlement of Meinard (person)". The name changed from kerk (church) to -ga (settlement) in the late-14th century. Minnertsga is a terp (artificial living hill) village from the 8th century.

The Dutch Reformed church was built in the 16th century, but has 13th century elements. The tower dates from 1505 and received a new roof in 1818. The church was damaged by fire in 1947 and restored between 1951 and 1955. In 1940, the Galileërkerk in Leeuwarden was demolished, and some of the headstones have been moved to Minnertsga.

Minnertsga was home to 1,140 people in 1840. There used to be a railway station in Minnertsga between 1902 and 1940. 85% of the residents of Minnertsga are members of the local interest groep.

Notable people 
 Jacobus Mancadan ( 1602–1680), painter and former grietman (mayor/judge)
 Hendrik Wagenvoort (1886–1976), professor in Latin language and Roman religion

Gallery

References

External links

Local interests site (in Dutch)

Waadhoeke
Populated places in Friesland